Murad IV (Murād-ı Rābiʿ; , 27 July 1612 – 8 February 1640) was the Sultan of the Ottoman Empire from 1623 to 1640, known both for restoring the authority of the state and for the brutality of his methods. Murad IV was born in Constantinople, the son of Sultan Ahmed I (r. 1603–17) and Kösem Sultan. He was brought to power by a palace conspiracy when he was just 11 years old, and he succeeded his uncle Mustafa I (r. 1617–18, 1622–23). Until he assumed absolute power on 18 May 1632, the empire was ruled by his mother, Kösem Sultan, as nāʾib-i salṭanat (regent). His reign is most notable for the Ottoman–Safavid War, of which the outcome would partition the Caucasus between the two Imperial powers for around two centuries, while it also roughly laid the foundation for the current Turkey–Iran–Iraq borders.

Early life 
Murad IV was born on 27 July 1612 to Ahmed I (reign 16031617) and his consort and later wife Kösem Sultan, an ethnic Greek. After his father's death when he was six years old, he was confined in the Kafes with his brothers, Suleiman, Kasim, Bayezid and Ibrahim.

Grand Vizier Kemankeş Ali Pasha and Şeyhülislam Yahya Efendi were deposed from their position. The next day, the child of the age of 6 was taken to the Eyüp Sultan Mausoleum. The swords of Prophet Muhammad and Yavuz Sultan Selim were bequeathed to him.  Five days later he was circumcised.

Reign

Early reign (1623–32)

Murad IV was for a long time under the control of his relatives and during his early years as Sultan, his mother, Kösem Sultan, essentially ruled through him. In this period, the Safavid Empire invaded Iraq, Northern Anatolia erupted in revolts, and in 1631 the Janissaries stormed the palace and killed the Grand Vizier, among others.

At the age of 16 in 1628, he had his brother-in-law (his sister Gevherhan Sultan's husband, who was also the former governor of Egypt), Kara Mustafa Pasha, executed for a claimed action "against the law of God".

After the death of the Grand Vizier Çerkes Mehmed Pasha in the winter of Tokat, Diyarbekir Beylerbeyi Hafiz Ahmed Pasha became a vizier on 8 February 1625.

An epidemic, which started in the summer of 1625 and called the plague of Bayrampaşa, spread to threaten the population of Istanbul. On average, a thousand people died every day. The people fled to the Okmeydanı to escape the plague. The situation was worse in the countryside outside of Istanbul.

Absolute rule and imperial policies (1632–1640)

Murad IV banned alcohol, tobacco, and coffee in Constantinople. He ordered execution for breaking this ban. He restored the judicial regulations by very strict punishments, including execution; he once strangled a grand vizier for the reason that the official had beaten his mother-in-law.

Fire of 1633
On 2 September 1633, the Cibali fire broke out, burning a fifth of the city.  The fire started during the day when a caulker burned the shrub and the ship caulked into the walls. The fire, which spread from three branches to the city. One arm lowered towards the sea. He returned from Zeyrek and walked to Atpazan. The most beautiful districts of Istanbul were ruined, from the Yeniodas, Mollagürani districts, Fener gate to Sultanselim, Mesihpaşa, Bali Pasha and Lutfi Pasha mosques, Şahı buhan Palace, Unkapanı to Atpazarı, Bostanzade houses, and Sofular Bazaar. The fire that lasted for 30 hours was only extinguished after the wind stopped.

The war against Safavid Iran
Murad IV's reign is most notable for the Ottoman–Safavid War (1623–39) against Persia (today Iran) in which Ottoman forces managed to conquer Azerbaijan, occupying Tabriz, Hamadan, and capturing Baghdad in 1638. The Treaty of Zuhab that followed the war generally reconfirmed the borders as agreed by the Peace of Amasya, with Eastern Georgia, Azerbaijan, and Dagestan staying Persian, Western Georgia stayed Ottoman. Mesopotamia was irrevocably lost for the Persians. The borders fixed as a result of the war, are more or less the same as the present border line between Iraq and Iran.

During the siege of Baghdad in 1638, the city held out for forty days but was compelled to surrender.

Murad IV himself commanded the Ottoman Army in the last years of the war.

Relations with the Mughal Empire
While he was encamped in Baghdad, Murad IV is known to have met ambassadors of the Mughal Emperor Shah Jahan, Mir Zarif and Mir Baraka, who presented 1000 pieces of finely embroidered cloth and even armor. Murad IV gave them the finest weapons, saddles and Kaftans and ordered his forces to accompany the Mughals to the port of Basra, where they set sail to Thatta and finally Surat.

Architecture
Murad IV put emphasis on architecture and in his period many monuments were erected.  The Baghdad Kiosk, built in 1635, and the Revan Kiosk, built in 1638 in Yerevan, were both built in the local styles. Some of the others include the Kavak Sarayı pavilion; the Meydanı Mosque; the Bayram Pasha Dervish Lodge, Tomb, Fountain, and Primary School; and the Şerafettin Mosque in Konya.

Music and poetry
Murad IV wrote many poems. He used the "Muradi" penname for his poems. He also liked testing people with riddles. Once he wrote a poetic riddle and announced that whoever came with the correct answer would get a generous reward. Cihadi Bey, a poet from Enderun School, gave the correct answer and he was promoted.

Murad IV was also a composer. He has a composition called "Uzzal Peshrev".

Family
Due to the prominence during his reign of his mother Kösem Sultan and the fact that all of his sons died in infancy, Murad IV's family is not well known.

Only three of his many concubines are known and of the thirty-two children that Evliya Çelebi said that Murad IV had, five have not yet been identified, and the name of six others is still unknown. 

Furthermore, no child had a certain nominated mother.

Consorts

Of the numerous concubines he had, only three certain consorts of Murad IV are known, plus some disputed:
Ayşe Sultan. First Haseki of Murad IV and the only one whose title is confirmed.
Şemsişah (Şemsperi) Sultan. According to L. Pierce, Murad IV had a second Haseki in the last years of his reign. The identity and title of this concubine are however disputed, but some have proposed Şemsişah as a probable identity. She started with a salary of 2,751 daily asper, the highest ever recorded for a concubine, but after seven months it was reduced to 2,000 daily asper, on par with Ayşe Sultan. She disappears from the records soon after Murad IV's death.
Sanavber Hatun. She founded a charity in the capital in 1628. Since this required high wealth and Murad's first children were born in 1627, she was likely his first concubine and mother of at least one of Murad's elder children.
Şemsperi Hatun. (disputed)
Emirgün's sister (disputed). Her brother, the governor of Yerevan, would offer it to Murad IV to earn his favors. Being beautiful, the sultan fell in love with her, but later left her in Damascus instead of taking her to the capital.
Rosana Sultan (existence disputed): according to the sources, she was the favorite of Murad IV, and she was tall, blonde and extremely pale. She had a bad temper and even the sultan feared her. She had followed him to war in 1635, but was sent back to Constantinople when Murad fell in love with Emirgün's sister. In the capital she was received with every honor, but jealousy for the new concubine led her to issue an imperial order to execute Murad IV's brothers, who hated her. When Murad returned, one of his sisters tried to accuse her, but he didn't believe her and furiously hit her. Eventually his mother Kösem Sultan managed to find evidence and witnesses against Rosana and Murad IV stabbed her himself. From that moment on, the sultan swore never to favor another woman. Although the story has spread widely in European sources, most historians dismiss it as a romantic legend or a fictionalized and more dramatic version of Ayşe Sultan's story.

Sons
Murad IV had at least fifteen sons, but none of them survived infancy and all of them died before their father (d. 1640): 
 Şehzade Ahmed (Constantinople, 21 December 1627 - Constantinople, ?).
 Şehzade (Fülan) (Constantinople, March 1631 - Constantinople, March 1631). Buried in the Ahmed I mausoleum in the Blue Mosque. 
 Şehzade Süleyman (Constantinople, February 1632 - Constantinople, 1632). Buried in the Ahmed I mausoleum in the Blue Mosque.
 Şehzade Mehmed (Constantinople, 8 August 1633 - Constantinople, ?). Born in the Pavilion of the Kandilli Garden, buried in the Ahmed I mausoleum in the Blue Mosque.
 Şehzade (Fülan) (Constantinople, February 1634 - Constantinople, March 1634). 
 Şehzade (Fülan) (Constantinople, 10 March 1634 - Constantinople, March 1634). 
 Şehzade Alaeddin (Constantinople, 16 August 1635 - Constantinople, 1637). Buried in the Ahmed I mausoleum in the Blue Mosque. 
 Şehzade (Fülan) (Izmit, 15 May 1638 - ?). Probably the son of Ayşe Sultan, as he is referred to as the son of the "Haseki". 
 Şehzade Abdülhamid (Constantinople, ? - Constantinople, ?). Buried in the Ahmed I mausoleum in the Blue Mosque.
 Şehzade Selim (Constantinople, ? - Constantinople, ?). Buried in the Ahmed I mausoleum in the Blue Mosque.
 Şehzade Orhan (Constantinople, ? - Constantinople, ?). Buried in the Ahmed I mausoleum in the Blue Mosque.
 Şehzade Numan (Constantinople, ? - Constantinople, ?). Buried in the Ahmed I mausoleum in the Blue Mosque.
 Şehzade Hasan (Constantinople, ? - Constantinople, ?). Buried in the Ahmed I mausoleum in the Blue Mosque.
 Şehzade Mahmud (Constantinople, ? - Constantinople, ?). Buried in the Ahmed I mausoleum in the Blue Mosque.
 Şehzade Osman (Constantinople, ? - Constantinople, ?). Buried in the Ahmed I mausoleum in the Blue Mosque.

Daughters
Murad IV had at least thirteen daughters. 

Unlike their brothers, at least eight of them survived at least to the age of marriage: 
 Fülane Sultan (Constantinople, 1627 - ?). She married Tüccarzade Mustafa Paşa in 1640.
 Gevherhan Sultan (Constantinople, February 1630 - ?). She married Haseki Mehmed Pasha.
 Hanzade Sultan (Constantinople, 1631 - ?, after 1675). She married Nakkaş Mustafa Pasha and she was widowed in 1657.
 Ismihan Sultan (Constantinople, 1632 - Constantinople, 1632). Called also Esmihan Sultan.
 Kaya Ismihan Sultan (Constantinople, 1633 - Constantinople, 1658). She married Melek Ahmed Paşah and she died in childbirth.
 Rabia Sultan (Constantinople, ? - Constantinople, ?). Buried in the Ahmed I mausoleum in the Blue Mosque.
 Fatma Sultan (Constantinople, ? - Constantinople, ?). Buried in the Ahmed I mausoleum in the Blue Mosque.
 Ayşe Sultan (Constantinople, ? - ?). She married Malatuk Süleyman Paşa before 1655.
 Hafsa Sultan (Constantinople, ? - ?).
 Fülane Sultan (Constantinople, ? - ?). She married Ammarzade Mehmed Paşah.
 Safiye Sultan (Constantinople, after 1634 - Constantinople, 1680 or after). She married Sarı Abaza Hüseyin Paşah (brother or son of Grand Vizier Siyavuş Paşah) in 1659. She had three sons and a daughter: Sultanzade Abubekr Bey, Sultanzade Mehmed Remzi Paşah (d. 21 November 1719), Sultanzade Abdüllah Bey (stillborn, after 1680) and Rukiye Hanımsultan (1680 - January 1697). She died to give birth to Abdüllah.
 Rukiye Sultan (Constantinople, 1640 - 1696/1703). She married Şeytân Melek İbrâhîm Pasha and was widowed in 1685. She had two daughters: Fatma Hanımsultan (1677 - 1727) and Ayşe Hanımsultan (1680 - 1717). She may have remarried to Gürcü Mehmed Paşah or Bıyıklı Mehmed Paşah in 1693. She was buried in the Şehzade Mosque.
Esma Sultan (? - ?). She died in infancy.

Death
Murad IV died from cirrhosis in Constantinople at the age of 27 in 1640.

Rumours had circulated that on his deathbed, Murad IV ordered the execution of his mentally disabled brother, Ibrahim (reigned 1640–48), which would have meant the end of the Ottoman line. However, the order was not carried out.

In popular culture 
In the TV series Muhteşem Yüzyıl: Kösem, Murad IV is portrayed by Cağan Efe Ak as a child, and Metin Akdülger as the Sultan.

In the film Three Thousand Years of Longing (2022), Murad IV is portrayed by Ogulcan Arman Uslu, with Kaan Guldur playing him a child.

See also
 Transformation of the Ottoman Empire
 Polish–Ottoman War (1633–34)
 Koçi Bey

References

Sources

External links

1612 births
1640 deaths
Ottoman sultans born to Greek mothers
Deaths from cirrhosis
Modern child monarchs
17th-century Ottoman sultans
Turks from the Ottoman Empire
Ottoman people of the Ottoman–Persian Wars